Arkansas, with its karst topography, has several beautiful show caves. This list of caves in Arkansas includes the location and date they opened to the public.

Caves
 Onyx Cave (1893) - Eureka Springs
 Cosmic Cavern (1927) - Berryville
 Mystic Caverns and Crystal Dome (1928) - Marble Falls
 Old Spanish Treasure Cave (1930s) - Gravette
 Blanchard Springs Caverns (1973) - Blanchard Springs
 Bull Shoals Caverns (1958)- Bull Shoals
 Lost valley cave, Eden waterfall - Ponca, Arkansas

See also
List of caves in the United States

Arkansas
Caves